Francis Almeric Spencer, 1st Baron Churchill DCL FRS (26 December 1779 – 10 March 1845) was a British peer and Whig politician from the Spencer family.

Early life
Born Lord Francis Almeric Spencer, he was the second youngest of the 4th Duke of Marlborough, and his wife, Lady Caroline Russell. Among his siblings were Lady Caroline Spencer (wife of Henry Agar-Ellis, 2nd Viscount Clifden), Lady Elizabeth Spencer (who married their cousin John Spencer, a grandson of the 3rd Duke of Marlborough), George Spencer-Churchill, 5th Duke of Marlborough, Lady Charlotte Spencer (wife of Rev. Edward Nares), Lord Henry John Spencer, Lady Anne Spencer (wife of Cropley Ashley-Cooper, 6th Earl of Shaftesbury), and Lady Amelia Spencer (wife of Henry Pytches Boyce).

His paternal grandparents were Charles Spencer, 3rd Duke of Marlborough, and the former Hon. Elizabeth Trevor (a daughter of Thomas Trevor, 2nd Baron Trevor). Among his paternal family were aunts Lady Diana Beauclerk and Lady Elizabeth Spencer. His maternal grandparents were John Russell, 4th Duke of Bedford (the British Ambassador to France), and, his second wife, the former Gertrude Leveson-Gower (eldest daughter of John Leveson-Gower, 1st Earl Gower). Among his maternal family was uncle Francis Russell, Marquess of Tavistock and his first cousins, Francis Russell, 5th Duke of Bedford, and John Russell, 6th Duke of Bedford.

Career
From 1801 to 1815, he was Member of Parliament (MP) for Oxfordshire and on his retirement from the Commons, was raised to the peerage as Baron Churchill, of Wychwood in the County of Oxford.

During the Napoleonic Wars he raised a Troop of volunteer cavalry in Oxford and was appointed its Captain on 3 November 1803 After the wars the independent troops in the county were consolidated into the North Western Oxfordshire Regiment of Yeomanry, with Spencer (now Lord Churchill) as Lieutenant-Colonel.

Personal life
Lord Churchill married Lady Frances FitzRoy, daughter of Augustus FitzRoy, 3rd Duke of Grafton, on 25 November 1800. Together, they were the parents of:

 Francis George Spencer, 2nd Baron Churchill (1802–1886), who married Lady Jane Conyngham, daughter of Gen. Sir Francis Conyngham, 2nd Marquess Conyngham, in 1849.
 Lt.-Col. Hon. George Augustus Spencer (1804–1877), who married Charlotte Munro, daughter of Maj.-Gen. John Munro, in 1834.
 Hon. Caroline Elizabeth Spencer (1805–1864), who married Robert Dillon, 3rd Baron Clonbrock, son of Luke Dillon, 2nd Baron Clonbrock, in 1830.
 Hon. General Sir Augustus Almeric Spencer (1807–1893), who married Helen Maria Campbell, daughter of Lt.-Gen. Sir Archibald Campbell, 1st Baronet, in 1836.
 Hon. William Henry Spencer (1810–1900), a Reverend who married Elizabeth Rose Thornhill, daughter of Thomas Thornhill, in 1838. After her death, he married Louisa Mercer Call, daughter of Sir William Call, 2nd Baronet, in 1852. After her death, he married Anna Maria Cowley Sheppard, daughter of John Horton Sheppard, in 1893.
 Hon. Robert Charles Henry Spencer (1817–1881), a Colonel who married Lady Louisa Spencer-Churchill, daughter of George Spencer-Churchill, 6th Duke of Marlborough, in 1845.
 Hon. Charles Frederic Octavius Spencer (1824–1895), the Vicar at Sutton, Buteshire, who married Hester Eliza Fardell, daughter of Rev. Henry Fardell, in 1847.
 Hon. Elizabeth Spencer (d. 1858), who married Rev. Havilland de Sausmarez, son of Thomas de Sausmarez, in 1850.

He died in 1845 and was succeeded by his eldest son, Francis.

Honours
Mount Churchill in British Columbia, Canada, was named in his honor in 1860 by Sir George Henry Richards.

References

External links 
 

Francis
Churchill, Francis Spencer, 1st Baron
Churchill, Francis Spencer, 1st Baron
Members of the Parliament of the United Kingdom for English constituencies
1
Peers of the United Kingdom created by George III
Churchill, Francis Spencer, 1st Baron
Spencer, Lord Francis
UK MPs 1801–1802
UK MPs 1802–1806
UK MPs 1806–1807
UK MPs 1807–1812
UK MPs 1812–1818
UK MPs who were granted peerages
Whig (British political party) MPs for English constituencies
Queen's Own Oxfordshire Hussars officers